Valea Morii may refer to several places in Romania:

 Valea Morii, a village in Vidra Commune, Alba County
 Valea Morii, a village in Bezdead Commune, Dâmbovița County
 Valea Morii, a village in the town of Tășnad, Satu Mare County
 Valea Morii, a tributary of the Izvor in Bihor County 
 Valea Morii (Hârtibaciu), a tributary of the Hârtibaciu in Brașov and Sibiu Counties
 Valea Morii (Iza), a tributary of the Iza in Maramureș County
 Valea Morii, a tributary of the Valea Luncanilor in Hunedoara County
 Valea Morii (Pârâul de Câmpie), a tributary of the Pârâul de Câmpie in Cluj and Mureș Counties
 Valea Morii (Târnava Mare), a tributary of the Târnava Mare in Mureș County
 Valea Morii, a tributary of the Vișeu in Maramureș County